Giacinto-Boulos Marcuzzo (born 24 April 1945, in San Polo di Piave, Italy) is a Roman Catholic Auxiliary Bishop Emeritus of the Latin Patriarchate of Jerusalem, resident in Nazareth. As at December 2020, he was Latin Patriarchal Vicar for Jerusalem and Palestine.

Biography
Giacinto-Boulos Marcuzzo studied philosophy and theology at the Major Patriarchal Seminary in Beit Jala. He was ordained a priest on June 22, 1969 in the Church of All Nations. Then he worked as a chaplain in Beit Jala in the West Bank, in Ramallah and in Malakal in southern Sudan, including as director of the minor seminary. Marcuzzo was also  teacher at the Minor Seminary of the Latin Patriarchate in Beit Jala.

In the years 1977-1980 Marcuzzo studied Dogmatic theology at the Pontifical Lateran University and theology of spirituality at the Teresianum in Rome. After obtaining a doctorate Marcuzzo became a lecturer at the Major Seminary in Beit Jala, being for a time its rector. He also lectured Patrology and Arabic Christian literature at the Bethlehem University.

In 1993 Marcuzzo was appointed Auxiliary Bishop of the Latin Patriarch of Jerusalem as Titular bishop of Siminina. He was consecrated bishop on the hands of the Latin Patriarch of Jerusalem Michel Sabbah on 3 July 1993 in the Church of the Holy Sepulchre. From 29 October 1994 he became titular bishop of Emmaus-Nicopolis. He resides in Nazareth as patriarchal vicar for Israel.

Marcuzzo is fluent in Italian, Arabic, French, English, German and Hebrew.

He retired on 29 August 2020.

References

External links

 Catholic-hierarchy.org

1945 births
Palestinian Roman Catholic bishops
20th-century Italian Roman Catholic theologians
21st-century Roman Catholic bishops in Israel
21st-century Italian titular bishops
Living people
People from the Province of Treviso
20th-century Italian titular bishops
21st-century Italian Roman Catholic theologians